Rowing competitions at the 2016 Summer Paralympics in Rio were held from 9 to 11 September 2016, at Lagoa Stadium at the Games' Copacabana hub.

Classification
Rowers are given a classification depending on the type and extent of their disability. The classification system allows rowers to compete against others with a similar level of function.

The three rowing classes are:
LTA (Legs, Trunk and Arms) - Mixed coxed fours
TA (Trunk and Arms) - Mixed double sculls
AS (Arms and shoulders) - Men's and women's singles

Events
Four rowing events are scheduled to be held, each over a course of 1000 metres:
Men's single sculls AS
Women's single sculls AS
Mixed double sculls TA
Mixed four coxed LTA

Qualification
Ninety-six athletes (48 male, 48 female) are expected to take part in this sport.

The majority of the spots were awarded based on the results at the 2015 World Rowing Championships, held at Lac d'Aiguebelette, France from August 30 to September 6, 2015. Places are awarded to National Olympic Committees, not to specific athletes. Further berths are distributed at the final Paralympic qualification regatta in Gavirate, Italy. A minimum of two places were held over for the host, Brazil, one rower of each gender. In the event, however, Brazil qualified that minimum number via the World Championships, and the host nation places were therefore added to the Bipartite commission quota distribution.  Russia have now been excluded from the 2016 Paralympics, and Germany and USA, as the fastest non-qualifiers in AS M1x and TA X2x respectively, will take Russia's place in those events.

Medal summary

Medal table

Medalists

See also
Rowing at the 2016 Summer Olympics

References

External links
Official Site of the 2016 Summer Paralympics 

 
2016
2016 Summer Paralympics events
Paralympics
Rowing competitions in Brazil